Francis James Foster (1872 – 9 September 1948) was an Australian politician, representing the Division of New England in the House of Representatives for the Australian Labor Party from 1906 to 1913.

Background
Born in Sofala, New South Wales, he received a primary education, and held various jobs including a miner, farmhand and teacher. He then became a shopkeeper and orchardist in Inverell.

Politics
Foster was an unsuccessful Labor candidate for the New South Wales Legislative Assembly for The Macquarie at the 1895 election and 1898 election. He was also unsuccessful at the 1904 election for Gough and the 1904 Bingara by-election. At the 1906 election, he was selected as the Labor candidate for the seat of New England, and went on to defeat Anti-Socialist candidate Edmund Lonsdale. He was re-elected to a second term at the 1910 election, defeating Commonwealth Liberal candidate William Fleming. Twice successful by only small margins, Foster remains the only successful Labor candidate in the history of the seat of New England. He held the seat until his defeat by Commonwealth Liberal candidate Percy Abbott at the 1913 election. He made two attempts for the NSW legislative Assembly, at the 1913 election for Darlinghurst and at the 1917 Macquarie by-election.

References

 

Australian Labor Party members of the Parliament of Australia
Members of the Australian House of Representatives for New England
Members of the Australian House of Representatives
1872 births
1948 deaths
Australian orchardists
20th-century Australian politicians